La ruleta de la fortuna or La ruleta de la suerte is the Spanish version of Wheel of Fortune. The first incarnation ran from 1990 to 1992 in Antena 3, the second one from 1993 to 1997 in Telecinco, and then, after a 9 year hiatus, a revival has been made on Antena 3 beginning in 2006. The show also airs internationally via Antena 3 Internacional.

Original 1990s versions (La ruleta de la fortuna)
The 1990s versions all awarded cash in the previous Spanish currency of the peseta, and the wheel's values were from 5,000 to 100,000 pesetas, with vowels costing 50,000 pesetas. Only three normal puzzles and the bonus round were played in this version. This version sometimes used two letter turners both working at once (unlike the 2008 Filipino version which had two puzzle board assistants alternating). The wheel also had a X2 (double wedge) and a 1/2 wedge (listed as "Divide by 2"), but unlike the current version, landing on the 1/2 cost the player half their cash and their turn. The Free Spin ("Turno Extra") was awarded automatically but did not carry over to the next round. The player who solved the puzzle kept their bank plus a bonus of 100,000 pesetas.

The scoreboards in the Telecinco version displayed two scores: the current round score on top and the grand total on the bottom.

Current version's (La ruleta de la suerte) gameplay
The three players each begin the game with a toss-up worth €100. This determines interview order. A second toss-up is played to determine first spinner, also worth €100, and a third toss-up is played before the final puzzle before the bonus puzzle, also worth €100. As of September 13, 2016, each player would be guaranteed €100.

The game is played the same as the basic U.S. game, but with a few exceptions. See the article Wheel of Fortune (US game show) for more information.

The current version's podium color sequence is blue-red-yellow.

Bonus Round
The player with the biggest total spins a wheel containing cash amounts of 1.000 €, 1.500 €, 2.000 €, 2.500 €, 3.000 €, 3.500 €, 4.000 €, 4.500 €, 5.000 €, 6.000 €, 7.000 €, 8.000 €, and a car. They get the letters R, S, F, Y, and O, (originally C, T, G, L, and I, later C, L, X, G, and A until August 30, 2015) and call 3 more consonants and a vowel before getting 10 seconds to solve the puzzle and win the bonus prize. The audience members all stand up when the bonus puzzle is solved. In the event the winner proceeds to the bonus round while holding a wedge that says "AYUDA FINAL," they can choose from a red, yellow, and blue envelope that will allow them an extra consonant, an extra vowel, or five more seconds. If they had both "Ayuda Final" and "Super Comodín", they could choose two envelopes.

The original bonus round had players calling their own letters, and as with the US version, they called five consonants and a vowel.

The €7,000 and €8,000 envelopes were introduced on September 28, 2012. There have been cases in which the maximum prize has been higher: on the special ninth anniversary of April 17, 2015, the maximum prize was €9,000, in the special tenth anniversary of April 18, 2016 was €10,000 and in the special eleventh anniversary of April 18, 2017 were €11,000. In the special charity with celebrities, the car is replaced by another one over with €10,000.
Since September 11, 2013, the Co-presenter is in charge of, once revealed the prize that contained the envelope that the contestant has obtained, to reveal where the car was.

Puzzles
Unlike the American version, each puzzle belongs to a given category, as indicated by on-screen transitions. A puzzle can fall under any one of these categories (in playing order, although the order may vary), all of which come from the current show running since 2006.

Prueba de Velocidad (Toss-Up puzzle)
As in the American version, a puzzle is revealed one letter at a time, and a player may buzz in at any time to solve. Unlike the U.S. version, players are allowed an unlimited number of guesses. There are three Toss-Ups in each show, two at the beginning and one in the near end. Usually, the first and third are song lyrics, while the second is always a "mad headline" (any piece of news that is strange or funny). Each puzzle is worth €100 (€200 on November 24, 2017), and contestants traditionally sing the lyrics to the puzzles with the song lyrics (with the host and audience occasionally joining in).

In the events of a tie before the Bonus Round, a Toss-Up is played to decide the player that proceeds to this Round, but no cash is awarded.

Panel normal (Normal Puzzle)
The standard puzzle.

Panel con Crono (Counter-Clock Puzzle)
This puzzle is somewhat different. It is similar to the US version's "Final Spin", except that a time limit of 2 minutes is set, and the contestants have to say one letter at a time, vowel or consonant, and if it is in the puzzle, they'll have 3 seconds to try to answer the puzzle.

Recently, a variation of this puzzle known as "Panel Crono Imagen" has begun to replace it, or to move it to the middle of the show. In this new puzzle, the host gives a question (such as "What's wrong here?") and a clue appears at the board (such as This is man's best friend). Contestants will have 45 seconds in which to flip the letters to reveal an image behind and to finally answer to the host's question. (There would be a dog with whiskers in the above example)

Both puzzles are worth €300 (€500 on the Premium edition and €600 on November 24, 2017) if a person can solve it, otherwise they are worth nothing.

Panel de la letra oculta (Hidden Letter Puzzle)
Before starting the puzzle, the host reveals the "hidden letter", which appears on-screen only for the audience at home, and is one of the consonants present on the puzzle. Then it is played as a regular puzzle, except that if a player says the hidden letter, which would appear in the puzzle colored in green, they will get a special wedge, not present in the wheel, that is only winnable in this puzzle called "Super Comodín", which can be used as a regular "Comodín", a "Doble Letra" or an "Ayuda Final" and has the shape of these three individual wedges all together. If no one finds the hidden letter or the one solving it doesn't have the "Super Comodín", no one will win the wedge.

Panel Misterio (Mystery Puzzle)
The puzzle has an extra puzzle attached to it (a la the short-lived "Puzzler" round in the U.S. version), and the player who solves the first puzzle gets a shot at the mystery puzzle. The letters P, I, S, T, and A (which conform the word "pista", "clue"), are revealed, and the player picks three consonants and a vowel as in the bonus round, and then has 10 seconds to solve it. Solving the puzzle earns extra cash.

Panel de Internet (Internet Puzzle)
The player who solves the puzzle wins a computer plus €100.

Panel del Espectador (Viewer's Puzzle)
These are puzzles where the home viewers can win money by texting the correct answer to the puzzle.

Panel con Bote (Jackpot Puzzle)
Played like the Jackpot round in the U.S. version, the jackpot begins at €3,000 (later €1,000) and increases with every spin. The player has to spin up the wedge that says BOTE, call a correct consonant, and solve the puzzle to win the jackpot. The audience typically stands up when the wedge is hit, and this round also sees them use tambourines and other noisemakers. This is usually the last puzzle before the Bonus Round and in any case it always decides the big winner. Only if the puzzle was solved quicker than expected, a toss-up would be played after it to stall for time, but it wouldn't change the winner.

Promotional Consideration Puzzles
Panel con Premio (Prize Puzzle)
A random four digit amount is revealed prior to the start of the round, and the player that solves the puzzle wins that amount as a bonus.
Panel 4 Opciones (4 Options' Puzzle)
The contestant who starts this round chooses a category from 4 options.
Panel del Bienestar (Welfare's Puzzle)

Panel de la Palabra
The puzzle has only one word, and after showing a letter, the board immediately hides it, so only one letter shows at a time. The board continues randomly revealing and hiding letters until someone solves the puzzle, worth €100.

The Wheel
Values range from €25 to €200 (later €0 to €200, and from €100 to €800 on the "Premium" edition in 2011). The audience typically chants common rhythmic chants as the player spins it. It has a Lose a Turn (PIERDE TURNO) and Bankrupt (QUIEBRA).

Vowels
Vowels are worth a flat €50 (€100 on early shows and on the "premium" edition in 2011, €25 on November 24, 2017), and must be purchased prior to spinning the wheel.

The Mystery Wedge
There is one mystery wedge on the wheel in Round 3. It either conceals a Quiebra (Bankrupt) or €10,000. Players must call a correct letter to be able to pick up the wedge, or take a flat €50 for each letter.

Other Spaces
Ayuda Final (Final Help)
Similar to the U.S. and Australian Million-Dollar Wedge. The player who lands on it and calls a letter in the puzzle gets to pick it up, and if they solve the puzzle without hitting a Quiebra (Bankrupt), they keep it for the rest of the game. If that player gets to the Bonus Round, they can choose from three envelopes (blue, red, or yellow) which award an extra consonant, an extra vowel, or five more seconds. As the "Super Comodín" works also as an "Ayuda Final", in the case the player getting to the Bonus Round has the "Ayuda Final" and the "Super Comodín", they get two envelopes instead of one.
X2 and 1/2
Respectively double and cut the player's score in half if any correct letter appears.
?
A wedge with a question mark that acts as the Mystery Wedge. It hides either a random euro amount from €100 to €600 or any other bonus or penalty. At first, the host offered a fixed amount to the player for not going for the content of the wedge. More recently, they gave them three options of what the wedge could hide, a bonus (like a Free Spin or a "X2", one negative (a Bankrupt, a Lose Turn or a "1/2") and an amount of money, usually from 200 to 500 euros, which would be given flatly, not multiplied by how many times the consonant appeared.
Me Lo Quedo (I'll Take It)
If the player claims the wedge, they can use it to steal all the money and wedges from one of their opponents.
€0
The player has to call a correct letter in order to continue, but earns nothing. Introduced on September 27, 2012.
Premio (Prize)
A bonus prize. The prize itself is displayed on the face-down side of the wedge. The player must solve the puzzle without hitting a Bankrupt to win it.
Gran Premio (Great Prize)
A bonus prize divided into two wedges, usually more valuable than a regular Premio. The player has to claim both wedges and solve the puzzle without hitting a Bankrupt to win it. If two different players get each a wedge, none of them would win it, unless one of them has the wedge "Me Lo Quedo" and steals the other wedge from the other player. As long as one of the wedges is still on the wheel, the other one is immune to the Bankrupt, and it will remain with the player puzzle after puzzle until both wedges are claimed or the game ends. If both have been claimed, they both will be lost once of the players owning one or both of them hits on a Bankrupt.
Comodin (Wild Card)
Works the same way as the Free Spin token in the U.S. (prior to it being replaced by a Free Play). Players earn it by calling a letter in the puzzle, and can redeem it to keep their turn should they lose it.
Doble Letra (Double Letter)
Works similar to the Wildcard in the U.S., it allows the player to give an extra consonant in the same spin. Unlike the U.S. Wildcard, it cannot be taken to the Bonus Round, and if the player buys a vowel after saying the consonant, he can't use it.
Todas las Vocales (All the Vowels)
When used, all the vowels present on the puzzle are revealed for free.
Exprés (Express)
Works similar to the Express Wedge in the U.S., except that the round has a 45-second time limit. Players earn €100 for each consonant, and can buy vowels for €50, but the catch is that they must solve the puzzle before the clock expires, or they lose all their money and/or prizes. If a player gives a letter not in the puzzle, they also lose all their money and/or prizes (although they do not lose any special wedges such as "Ayuda Final." Also, the player has to pick up the wedge off the wheel if they accept the challenge, meaning only one attempt in the whole show is allowed.
Empiezo Yo (I'll Start)
This wedge can only be used when starting a new puzzle. It allows the player who uses it to steal the turn to whoever had it and start the puzzle.
Se lo Doy (I'll Give it to Them)
If a player landed on this wedge, they were forced to give all the money they had earned on the round as well as all of the wedges they had collected during the whole game to the one opponent of their choice. They didn't lose the turn, though, and that opponent needed, as usual, to get the turn and solve the puzzle to win the given money, even though they kept the wedges.
Quiebra/€1,000/Quiebra (Bankrupt/€1,000/Bankrupt)
Similar to the Bankrupt/$10,000/Bankrupt wedge in the U.S. (replaced by the million-dollar wedge). At first the €1,000 were treated like a flat amount which wouldn't be multiplied, later it was treated like regular cash, which means it would be multiplied by all the times the letter appeared on the puzzle. The wedge was also worth €1,500 on the 1,500th episode as well as €2,000 on the 2,000th show. On the "premium" edition from 2011, the wedge could be worth €10,000, €30,000, or €50,000. If a player claimed that wedge and carried that wedge to the bonus round, an envelope containing the appropriate amount would be placed someplace on the bonus wheel.

External links
Official webpage

Spanish game shows
Wheel of Fortune (franchise)
Roulette and wheel games
1991 Spanish television series debuts
1997 Spanish television series endings
2006 Spanish television series debuts
Spanish television series based on American television series